The 1997–98 OHL season was the 18th season of the Ontario Hockey League. The Toronto St. Michael's Majors name was reactivated when they are awarded a franchise, to play in the east division. The Detroit Whalers became the Plymouth Whalers. Eighteen teams each played 66 games. The Guelph Storm won the J. Ross Robertson Cup, defeating the Ottawa 67's.

Expansion

Toronto St. Michael's Majors
On August 15, 1996, the Ontario Hockey League announced that the Toronto St. Michael's Majors would join the league as an expansion team, beginning in the 1997-98 season. The Majors would play their home games at Maple Leaf Gardens, in which they shared the arena with the Toronto Maple Leafs of the National Hockey League. The Majors would join the East Division.

Previously, the Toronto St. Michael's Majors were a junior hockey franchise from 1906-1962, as they ceased operations at the conclusion of the 1961-62 season. The Majors won the Memorial Cup in 1934, 1945, 1947 and 1961.

The Majors were the first OHL franchise based out of Toronto in eight years, as their previous franchise, the Toronto Marlboros, relocated to Hamilton following the 1988-89 season.

Rebranding

Detroit Whalers to Plymouth Whalers
The Detroit Whalers rebranded their team as the Plymouth Whalers during the summer of 1997. The Whalers franchise moved to the Compuware Sports Arena in 1996-97, which is located in Plymouth. The team would retain their current team name and uniforms.

Realignment
The newest Ontario Hockey League club, the Toronto St. Michael's Majors, joined the East Division. Due to the Majors joining the East, the OHL moved the North Bay Centennials from the East Division to the Central Division, while the Erie Otters moved from the Central Division to the West Division. This created three six-team divisions in the 18 team league.

Regular season

Final standings
Note: DIV = Division; GP = Games played; W = Wins; L = Losses; T = Ties; OTL = Overtime losses; GF = Goals for; GA = Goals against; PTS = Points; x = clinched playoff berth; y = clinched division title; z = earned first round bye

East Division

Central Division

West Division

Scoring leaders
Note: GP = Games played; G = Goals; A = Assists; Pts = Points; PIM = Penalty minutes

Leading goaltenders
Note: GP = Games played; Mins = Minutes played; W = Wins; L = Losses: OTL = Overtime losses;  SL = Shootout losses; GA = Goals Allowed; SO = Shutouts; GAA = Goals against average

Playoffs

Division quarter-finals

East Division

(2) Belleville Bulls vs. (5) Peterborough Petes

(3) Kingston Frontenacs vs. (4) Oshawa Generals

Central Division

(2) Barrie Colts vs. (5) Sudbury Wolves

(3) Kitchener Rangers vs. (4) Owen Sound Platers

West Division

(1) London Knights vs. (4) Erie Otters

(2) Plymouth Whalers vs. (3) Sarnia Sting

OHL quarter-finals

(C1) Guelph Storm vs. (C5) Sudbury Wolves

(E1) Ottawa 67's vs. (C4) Owen Sound Platers

(W1) London Knights vs. (E3) Kingston Frontenacs

(E2) Belleville Bulls vs. (W2) Plymouth Whalers

OHL semi-finals

(C1) Guelph Storm vs. (W2) Plymouth Whalers

(E1) Ottawa 67's vs. (W1) London Knights

OHL finals

(C1) Guelph Storm vs. (E1) Ottawa 67's

Playoff scoring leaders
Note: GP = Games played; G = Goals; A = Assists; Pts = Points; PIM = Penalty minutes

Playoff leading goaltenders

Note: GP = Games played; Mins = Minutes played; W = Wins; L = Losses: OTL = Overtime losses; SL = Shootout losses; GA = Goals Allowed; SO = Shutouts; GAA = Goals against average

All-Star teams

First team
David Legwand, Centre, Plymouth Whalers
Rob Mailloux, Left Wing, Kingston Frontenacs
Brian Willsie, Right Wing, Guelph Storm
Chris Allen, Defence, Kingston Frontenacs
Sean Blanchard, Defence, Ottawa 67's
Bujar Amidovski, Goaltender, Toronto St. Michael's Majors
Gary Agnew, Coach, London Knights

Second team
Jon Sim, Centre, Sarnia Sting
Colin Pepperall, Left Wing, Erie Otters
Maxim Spiridonov, Right Wing, London Knights
Ric Jackman, Defence, Sault Ste. Marie Greyhounds
Chris Hajt, Defence, Guelph Storm
Robert Esche, Goaltender, Plymouth Whalers
George Burnett, Coach, Guelph Storm

Third team
Peter Sarno, Centre, Windsor Spitfires
Jeremy Adduono, Left Wing, Sudbury Wolves
Matt Bradley, Right Wing, Kingston Frontenacs
Jeff Brown, Defence, London Knights
Brian Campbell, Defence, Ottawa 67's
Tyrone Garner, Goaltender, Oshawa Generals
Lou Crawford, Coach, Belleville Bulls

Awards

1998 OHL Priority Selection
On June 6, 1998, the OHL conducted the 1998 Ontario Hockey League Priority Selection at the Barrie Molson Centre in Barrie, Ontario. The Brampton Battalion held the first overall pick in the draft, and selected Jay Harrison from the Oshawa Legionaires. Harrison was awarded the Jack Ferguson Award, awarded to the top pick in the draft.

The 1998 draft was the first draft for the newest OHL expansion teams, the Brampton Battalion and Mississauga IceDogs, who would begin to play during the 1998-99 season.

Below are the players who were selected in the first round of the 1998 Ontario Hockey League Priority Selection.

See also
List of OHA Junior A standings
List of OHL seasons
1998 Memorial Cup
1998 NHL Entry Draft
1997 in sports
1998 in sports

References

HockeyDB

Ontario Hockey League seasons
OHL